Hamra Zairovna Tairova (1912-1990) was a Soviet-Tajikistani Politician (Communist).

She served as Minister of Building, Country- and City Development.

References

1912 births
1990 deaths
20th-century Tajikistani women politicians
20th-century Tajikistani politicians
Soviet women in politics
Tajikistani communists
Women government ministers of Tajikistan